Richard Pratt Marvin (December 23, 1803 – January 11, 1892) was an American lawyer and politician from New York. A Whig, he served in the United States House of Representatives from 1837 to 1841.

Early life
Marvin was born on December 23, 1803, in Fairfield, Herkimer County, New York.  He was a son of Selden Marvin and Charlotte (née Pratt) Marvin. His family removed to Dryden, New York, in 1809. His brother, William Marvin, was a United States federal judge and the 7th Governor of Florida.

He studied law, was admitted to the bar in 1829, and commenced practice in Jamestown, New York.

Career
He was a member from Chautauqua County of the New York State Assembly in 1836.

Marvin was elected as a Whig to the 25th and 26th United States Congresses, and served from March 4, 1837, to March 3, 1841. He was chairman of the Committee on Expenditures in the Post Office Department (26th Congress).

He was a delegate to the New York State Constitutional Convention of 1846. He was a justice of the New York Supreme Court (8th District) from 1847 to 1871, and was ex officio a judge of the New York Court of Appeals in 1855 and 1863. Afterwards he resumed the practice of law in Jamestown.

Personal life
On September 8, 1834, Marvin was married to Isabella Newland (1811–1872), a daughter of David Newland and Jane (née McHarg) Newland. Together, they were the parents of:

 Selden Erastus Marvin (1835–1899), the Adjutant General of New York who married Katharine Langdon Parker (1846–1907) in 1868.
 David Newland Marvin (1839–1875), who married Julia Ormes, a daughter of Dr. Cornelius Ormes, in 1870.
 Mary Elizabeth Marvin (1841–1907), who married Benjamin Goodrich, founder of the B. F. Goodrich Company.
 William Richard Marvin (1843–1863), who died unmarried of disease contracted while serving in the Army of the Potomac during the Civil War.
 Isabella Marvin (1849–1881), who died unmarried.

Marvin died on January 11, 1892, in Jamestown, Chautauqua County, New York. He was buried at the Lakeview Cemetery in Jamestown.

References

External links

1803 births
1892 deaths
Members of the New York State Assembly
New York Supreme Court Justices
Judges of the New York Court of Appeals
People from Fairfield, New York
Politicians from Jamestown, New York
Whig Party members of the United States House of Representatives from New York (state)
People from Dryden, New York
19th-century American politicians
19th-century American judges